Events in the year 2017 in Lithuania.

Incumbents 
 President: Dalia Grybauskaitė
 Prime Minister: Saulius Skvernelis
 Seimas Speaker: Viktoras Pranckietis

Deaths 
17 March – Laurynas Stankevičius, economist and politician, former Prime Minister (b. 1935)
6 June – Rokas Žilinskas, journalist and politician, member of the Lithuanian Parliament (b. 1972)

References

 
2010s in Lithuania
Years of the 21st century in Lithuania
2017 in Europe
Lithuania